Gustaf "Guus" Hendrik Mantik (26 April 1928 – 8 August 2001) was an Indonesian military officer, governor, and parliamentarian. Mantik began his military career in 1946 as part the "Loyalty of the Indonesian People from Sulawesi" (or Kebaktian Rakjat Indonesia Sulawesi (KRIS)) during the Indonesian National Revolution. Later in his military career, Mantik would become territorial commander of two military districts: Military Territory IX / East Kalimantan (or Kodam IX/Mulawarman) from 1971 to 1973 and Military Territory V / Jakarta (or Kodam Jaya) from 1973 to 1977. He was appointed as Governor of North Sulawesi in 1980 and held the office until 1985. After the death of Sunandar Prijosudarmo, Mantik assumed Sunandar's role as Deputy Chairman of the People's Consultative Assembly (or Majelis Permusyawaratan Rakyat (MPR)) until 1987. Mantik died on 8 August 2001 and was buried in the Kalibata Heroes Cemetery in Jakarta.

References

Bibliography

 
 
 
 
 

1928 births
2001 deaths
Indonesian Christians
Minahasa people
Governors of North Sulawesi
People from Bandung